In enzymology, an anthranilate 1,2-dioxygenase (deaminating, decarboxylating) is an enzyme that catalyzes the chemical reaction

anthranilate + NAD(P)H + 2 H+ + O2  catechol + CO2 + NAD(P)+ + NH3

The 5 substrates of this enzyme are anthranilate, NADH, NADPH, H+, and O2, whereas its 5 products are catechol, CO2, NAD+, NADP+, and NH3.

This enzyme belongs to the family of oxidoreductases, specifically those acting on paired donors, with O2 as oxidant and incorporation or reduction of oxygen. The oxygen incorporated need not be derived from O2 with NADH or NADPH as one donor, and incorporation of two atoms o oxygen into the other donor.  The systematic name of this enzyme class is anthranilate,NAD(P)H:oxygen oxidoreductase (1,2-hydroxylating, deaminating, decarboxylating). Other names in common use include anthranilate hydroxylase, anthranilic hydroxylase, and anthranilic acid hydroxylase.  This enzyme participates in 3 metabolic pathways: benzoate degradation via hydroxylation, carbazole degradation, and nitrogen metabolism.  It employs one cofactor, iron.

References

 
 

EC 1.14.12
NADPH-dependent enzymes
NADH-dependent enzymes
Iron enzymes
Enzymes of unknown structure
Anthranilates